Micromyrtus erichsenii is a plant species of the family Myrtaceae endemic to Western Australia.

It blooms between February and November producing white-cream flowers.

It is found on sandplains and flats in the south eastern Wheatbelt and south western Goldfields-Esperance regions of Western Australia where it grows in clay soils.

References

erichsenii
Flora of Western Australia
Plants described in 1905